Ljubomir Kerekeš (born 16 January 1960) is a Croatian film, theatre and television actor.

Life and work
Kerekeš began acting in 1980 in his hometown of Varaždin and between 1982 and 1996 was a member of the theatre ensemble at the Croatian National Theatre in Varaždin. In 1996 he moved to the Kerempuh theatre in Zagreb and in 1998 moved again to the Croatian National Theatre in Zagreb, where he has been working until 2014. In 2014, he returned to the National Theatre in Varaždin.

Apart from theatre, Kerekeš also appeared in a number of Croatian TV series and feature films, and is best known in the country for his role of major Aleksa in the hugely popular 1996 black comedy film How the War Started on My Island. He also appeared alongside Richard Gere in the 2007 American action-thriller The Hunting Party.

Personal life 
His wife's name is Jasenka, and she works in Varaždin National Theatre. They have a daughter Ema and son Jan, who is also an actor.

Selected filmography

Voice-over roles

References

External links

Ljubomir Kerekeš profile at the Croatian National Theatre in Zagreb website 

1960 births
Living people
People from Varaždin
21st-century Croatian male actors
20th-century Croatian male actors
Croatian comedians
Croatian male actors
Croatian male television actors
Croatian male film actors
Croatian male stage actors
Croatian male voice actors
Croatian theatre directors
Croatian television directors
Croatian dramatists and playwrights
Croatian Theatre Award winners
Vladimir Nazor Award winners